LaGrange Township is one of the eighteen townships of Lorain County, Ohio, United States. As of the 2010 census the population was 6,164, of whom 4,061 lived in the unincorporated portion of the township.

Geography
Located in central Lorain County, it borders the following townships and village:
Carlisle Township - north
Grafton - northeast
Grafton Township - east
Litchfield Township, Medina County - southeast corner
Penfield Township - south
Wellington Township - southwest corner
Pittsfield Township - west
New Russia Township - northwest corner

The village of LaGrange is located in central LaGrange Township, and the community of Pheasant Run is in the southwest part of the township.

Name and history
It is the only LaGrange Township statewide.

Government
The township is governed by a three-member board of trustees, who are elected in November of odd-numbered years to a four-year term beginning on the following January 1. Two are elected in the year after the presidential election and one is elected in the year before it. There is also an elected township fiscal officer, who serves a four-year term beginning on April 1 of the year after the election, which is held in November of the year before the presidential election. Vacancies in the fiscal officership or on the board of trustees are filled by the remaining trustees.

References

External links

County website

Townships in Lorain County, Ohio
Townships in Ohio